William Clyde "Rabbit" Robinson (March 5, 1882 – April 8, 1915), was a professional baseball player for 16 years from 1900 to 1915. He played three seasons in the major leagues for the Washington Senators (1903), Detroit Tigers (1904), and Cincinnati Reds (1910).  

Robinson was born in 1882 at Wellsburg, West Virginia. He began playing professional baseball in 1900 at age 18. He played for the Kansas City Blue Stockings of the Western League in 1901 and 1902 and compiled a .298 batting average in 1902.

In 1903, Robinson made his major league debut with the Washington Senators. He appeared in 103 games but his batting average fell to .212. While with the Senators, he appeared in 45 games at second base, 30 games in the outfield, 24 games at shortstop, and five games at third base.

In 1904, Robinson played for the Detroit Tigers, appearing in 101 games with a .241 batting average and .315 on-base percentage. With Detroit, he appeared in 30 games at shortstop, 26 games at third base, 20 games in the outfield, and 19 games at second base.

From 1905 to 1910, Robinson played for the Milwaukee Brewers of the American Association. He got another shot in the major leagues in 1910, appearing in two games for the Cincinnati Reds. 

Robinson played in 206 major league games, 64 as a second baseman, 54 as a shortstop, 50 as an outfielder, and 33 as a third baseman.  He compiled a .223 career batting average and a .294 on-base percentage, with 156 hits, 71 runs scored, 63 bases on balls, 30 stolen bases, and 38 extra base hits.  

In June 1910, Cincinnati traded Robinson to the Louisville Colonels. Robinson continued playing in the minor leagues, including stints with the Louisville Colonels (1910-1911), Wilkes-Barre Barons (1911), Canton Senators (1913), and Waterbury Contenders (1914).

In March 1915, Robinson became ill at Waterbury, Connecticut, where he had played shortstop for the local baseball team in 1914. He died there in April 1915. Robinson was 33 years old at the time of his death.  He was born in Wellsburg, West Virginia and died in Waterbury, Connecticut.

References

External links
 Baseball-Reference.com

Cincinnati Reds players
Detroit Tigers players
Baseball players from West Virginia
Washington Senators (1901–1960) players
People from Wellsburg, West Virginia
1882 births
1915 deaths
Columbus Senators players
Anderson Anders players
Kansas City Blues (baseball) players
Kansas City Blue Stockings players
Milwaukee Brewers (minor league) players
San Francisco Seals (baseball) players
Louisville Colonels (minor league) players
Wilkes-Barre Barons (baseball) players
Waterbury Contenders players